Scarlett Harlett is the stage name of Harry Mulvany (born 1995), a British drag queen from the Isle of Dogs in East London best known for appearing on series 3 of RuPaul's Drag Race UK.

Career
Mulvany has been performing in drag since the age of 17, after watching RuPaul's Drag Race. He has played extras in Absolutely Fabulous and Rocketman.

Filmography

Television
 RuPaul's Drag Race UK (series 3)

References

Living people
1995 births
20th-century LGBT people
21st-century LGBT people
English drag queens
Gay entertainers
People from London
RuPaul's Drag Race UK contestants